The Enhanced Spelling of the Indonesian Language (EYD) is the spelling system used for the Indonesian language.

History 
The Enhanced Spelling of the Indonesian Language (EYD) is the spelling system used for the Indonesian language.  The system is an orthography released in 1972 to replace the Republican Spelling System (RSS, also called the Soewandi Spelling System, SSS). A joint initiative of Indonesia and neighboring country Malaysia (which also introduced the similar Joint Rumi Spelling system), the aim of the change in 1972 was to introduce greater harmonization of the Indonesian and Malay-language orthographies. The adoption of the new EYD system, to begin on the 27th anniversary of Indonesia's independence on 17 August 1972, was decreed by President Suharto on the previous day. Government departments were instructed to begin using the EYD system on 1 January 1973.  On 27 August 1975, the Minister of Education and Culture issued a decree which provided a detailed explanation of the changes proposed in the new system and marked the official use of EYD system. It was formerly known as the Indonesian Spelling System (EBI), often referred to as the Indonesian Spelling System General Guidelines (PUEBI), between 2015 and 2022.

Characteristics

Republican-to-EYD letter changes

Foreign loan letters
Letters that had previously been included in the Republican Spelling as foreign loan letters are officially used in the EYD Spelling.

Q and X
The letters Q and X are used in scientific subjects. Examples:
 Sinar-X (X-ray)

The letter Q is also used as needed for Islamic subjects. Examples:
 Quran
 Al-Furqan
 Al-Baqarah

Affixes and prepositions
The writing of di- and ke- (affixes) can be distinguished from di and ke (prepositions), where di- and ke- are written together with the words that follow it, for example diambil, kehendak (is being taken, desire), while di and ke are written separately with the words that follow it, for example di rumah, ke pasar (at home, to the market). This is different from the former Republican Spelling, where both di- and di are written together with the words following it.

Reduplication
Reduplication, mostly used in plural form of words, has to be fully written with letters, so the use of the number "2" as used in the Republican Spelling is no longer valid. The practice remains common in informal usage such as in text messaging.

Changes
Various minor changes were announced after 1975:
 On 9 September 1987, the Minister of Education and Culture issued a ministerial decree which updated the previous spelling system and which remained valid for 22 years. 
 On 31 July 2009, the Minister of National Education issued a decree outlining further changes. The update included optional diacritics for ⟨e⟩ as ⟨é⟩ [e] and ⟨e⟩ [ə].
 On 26 November 2015, the Minister of Education and Culture issue a ministerial regulation about spelling system. For the first time, the term "Indonesian spelling system" was used; previously the term used was "Enhanced Spelling of the Indonesian Language". There were only minor changes compared to previous updates including the addition of a new diphthong of ⟨ei⟩ (previously there were only 3 diphthongs, ⟨ai⟩, ⟨au⟩ and ⟨oi⟩), optional diacritics for ⟨e⟩ as ⟨é⟩ [e], ⟨è⟩ [ɛ], and ⟨ê⟩ [ə], and new rules on the usage of bold letters (abolishment the usage of bold letter for lemma entries in dictionary).
 On 16 August 2022, in time for the spelling system's fiftieth anniversary, new update for the spelling system was issued. It restored the "Enhanced Spelling of the Indonesian Language" term. Like the previous update, it also introduced minor changes: among others, it introduced the monophthong ⟨eu⟩ [ɘ], reaffirming the use of optional diacritics ⟨ê⟩ [ə], and limited the use of number words to singular numbers.

See also
 New Rumi Spelling
 Republican Spelling System
 Van Ophuijsen Spelling System

References

External links

Indonesian language
Spelling reform